This is a timeline of Yunnan and Guizhou.

4th century BC

2nd century BC

1st century BC

1st century

2nd century

3rd century

4th century

6th century

7th century

8th century

9th century

10th century

11th century

12th century

13th century

14th century

15th century

16th century

17th century

Gallery

References

Bibliography
 .

 
 
 
 .

 
 
 .

 

 
 

History of Yunnan
History of Guizhou